Dying Fetus is an American death metal band originally from Greater Upper Marlboro, Maryland, which formed in 1991.  Various line-up changes throughout the years have left John Gallagher as the sole remaining original member, as well as the band's driving force. According to Gallagher, the band name was chosen while the members were young and was intended to be offensive. To date, Dying Fetus has released eight studio albums.

History

Beginnings (1991–1996) 

Dying Fetus was founded in 1991 in Upper Marlboro, Maryland, by John Gallagher (guitar, vocals) and Jason Netherton (bass, vocals). The band began in earnest when the pair met up with guitarist/vocalist Nick Speleos in 1992. It was decided then that Gallagher would fill in on drums until a proper drummer was found. The writing of this period resulted in the 1993 demo Bathe In Entrails In late 1993, the band found drummer Rob Belton, as well as guitarist Brian Latta, who replaced the departing Nick Speleos (which also thrust John Gallagher back into the role of guitarist and vocalist). Together the new four-piece lineup recorded the Infatuation with Malevolence demo in early 1994, later released together with the first demo in 1995 as a compilation on California Indie label Wild Rags Records. Songs included all tracks from both demos as one CD.

In 1996, the band released their first album, Purification through Violence, on short-lived Illinois label Pulverizer Records. The album marked a further refinement of the band's developing sound of death metal riffing, combined with heavy slams, over seven original songs, and one Napalm Death cover, "Scum". Drummer Rob Belton left and the band was joined briefly in 1995 for a year by drummer Casey Buckler, with whom they performed live, yet never recorded with. Casey was asked to leave the band as they agreed he would play drums for a tour they had that year.

Rise to underground prominence (1996–2000) 

Relying on self-promotion, the band toured sporadically for 4 years straight starting in summer 1996 with their first full US tour alongside Kataklysm and Monstrosity, with the first appearance of future drummer Erik Sayenga as drummer replacing Casey Buckler. However, by spring 1997, Erik Sayenga left the band, and during a short Texas tour in May 1997, drummer Kevin Talley was located and subsequently joined full-time by the summer of 1997. At this point, the band caught the attention of German indie label Morbid Records, who signed them early in 1998 for a one-album deal. Almost immediately afterwards, the band released their second album, Killing on Adrenaline.

Morbid Records supplied the band with modest promotion in the death metal underground by releasing the album in Europe (while the band released it on their own label 'Blunt Force Records' in North America). Subsequently, they rose to prominence with notable live performances, such as appearances at Milwaukee metalfest (1998-2000) and tours in the US and Canada in 1998 (with Deeds of Flesh) and in Europe (with Deranged). However, guitarist Brian Latta left the band in late 1998, ushering in new guitarist "Sparky" Voyles, and in 1999 the band embarked on their first headlining tour of the US, over three weeks dubbed the "Underground Terrorism" tour. The tour was followed shortly thereafter by the Grotesque Impalement EP, which the band again released on their own Blunt Force Records label imprint.

Relapse Records and new lineup (2000–2003) 
By 2000, Dying Fetus caught the attention of another underground metal label, the indie company Relapse Records, who subsequently signed the band.

Once more returning to Steve Carr's Hit and Run Studios in Maryland (where each previous Dying Fetus album was recorded), Dying Fetus recorded in the spring of 2000 their Relapse debut (and overall third full-length album), Destroy the Opposition. This album featured even stronger political themes, and songwriting that was to highly influence the "deathcore" scene in subsequent years. The album was included in Decibels Top 100 Albums of the decade list for the 2000s (Decibel Magazine Special Edition, December 2009), as well as to Decibel's "Hall of Fame" (#89, July 2012).

However, following the release of Destroy the Opposition, original member Jason Netherton left the band for personal reasons, and thereafter guitarist Voyles and drummer Talley left the band only months after the album's release (they since went on to form the band Misery Index). Gallagher recruited guitarist Mike Kimball, singer Vince Matthews, bassist/backup vocalist Sean Beasley, and the returning Eric Sayenga on drums.

With the new lineup, the band released their 4th album, Stop at Nothing, in 2003, another album featuring Carr's production and strong political themes. A promotional video was shot for the track "One Shot, One Kill".

Five members, return to form (2003–present) 

Dying Fetus toured extensively for Stop at Nothing, and got airplay for the music video for "One Shot, One Kill" on Headbanger's Ball. Another tool that led to exposure of the band was more mainstream metal attention of Relapse Records (with acts such as Mastodon gaining popularity), as well as a full North American tour with GWAR in 2005. However, the Stop at Nothing lineup dissolved slightly in the years that followed as drummer Erik Sayenga parted yet again, and singer Vince Matthews went on to form Criminal Element. However, Dying Fetus came back yet again, bassist Beasley took over on vocals, and drummer Duane Timlin (ex-Divine Empire/Broken Hope) joined the ranks in 2006.

That lineup then recorded War of Attrition, which was released in March 2007. Themes include attacking reality TV, the war on terrorism, racial ignorance, and the flaws in the criminal justice system. Songs include "Homicidal Retribution", "Raping the System", and "Parasites of Catastrophe". Dying Fetus' second music video was made for "Homicidal Retribution".

Yet another lineup change occurred on the Dying Fetus front in July 2007: drummer Duane Timlin was fired due to incompatibilities. The newest drummer for the band is Trey Williams, from the local Baltimore band Severed Head. Mike Kimball also left the band and they've remained a trio since.

On September 15, 2009, Dying Fetus released their sixth album, Descend into Depravity on Relapse Records. Three years later, their follow-up to this record Reign Supreme, would be released on June 19, 2012. The band released the first single from the album, "Subjected to a Beating", on April 2, 2012.

Dying Fetus headlined a US tour being supported by Exhumed, Abiotic and Waking the Cadaver. Devourment was intended to be on the bill to play the tour, but dropped off a month beforehand. Rivers of Nihil appeared in select spots of the tour.

On November 4, 2013, after Avenged Sevenfold were announced as a headliner for Download Festival 2014, a fan of the band claimed that other bands were more deserving of a headline spot at the festival, and said "Everyone is going on about that this is good to give new blood a chance, then why not Machine Head, Lamb of God, Testament, Dying Fetus or Carcass? Give them a chance". Due to the smaller size of the band's fanbase, this sparked a mock internet campaign with the hashtag "#WhyNotDyingFetus?" trending worldwide. On November 6, 2013, Andy Copping announced on his Twitter feed that due to the internet campaign, Dying Fetus had been confirmed to be playing at the festival. The band were the first to play the main stage on the Saturday.

By June 2016, Dying Fetus had been working on their eighth studio album, which was expected to be released in the summer of 2017.

By mid-April 2017, both the band and Relapse Records had announced via social media the release of their eighth studio album, entitled Wrong One to Fuck With, which was released on June 23, 2017, and included a promotional video for Gallagher, Williams, Beasley, and Associates – Death Metal Attorney's at Law.

In 2019, the band's music was featured on the South Park episode "Band in China".

Musical style 
Dying Fetus has been described as death metal, grindcore, and technical death metal.

Their sound is noted for its "vicious" blast beats as well as the guttural vocal style of frontman John Gallagher.

Members 

Current members
 John Gallagher – guitars, vocals (1991–present), drums (1991–1994)
 Sean Beasley – bass (2001–present), vocals (2004–present)
 Trey Williams – drums (2007–present)

Former members
 Nick Speleos – guitars, vocals (1991–1994)
 Rob Belton – drums (1994–1997)
 Brian Latta – guitars (1994–1999)
 Jason Netherton – bass, vocals (1991–2000)
 Kevin Talley – drums (1997–2001)
 John "Sparky" Voyles – guitars (1999–2001)
 Bruce Greig – guitars (2001–2002) (died 2022)
 Vince Matthews – vocals (2001–2004)
 Erik Sayenga – drums (2001–2005)
 Duane Timlin – drums (2006–2007)
 Mike Kimball – guitars (2003–2008)

Live musicians
 Casey Buckler – drums (1995–1996)
 Erik Sayenga – drums (1996–1997)
 John Longstreth – drums (2004)

Timeline

Discography

Studio albums

Compilation albums

Video albums

EPs

Demos

Music videos

References

External links 

Facebook
Relapse Records band page

American death metal musical groups
Heavy metal musical groups from Maryland
Political music groups
Relapse Records artists
Musical groups established in 1991
American musical trios
1991 establishments in Maryland
Good Life Recordings artists